The Movement Party, previously known as the Tunisia Will Movement and by its shortened name Al-Irada, is a Tunisian political party that was founded on 20 December 2015 by former Tunisian president Moncef Marzouki.

History
After his defeat in the 2014 presidential election, Moncef Marzouki announced that he would create a new political party before the end of 2015. It was given a temporary name, Citizen People Movement.

The party was officially established on 20 December 2015.

In September 2018, 80 executives and other members left the party. They justified their decision by the impossibility of reforming the party at the political and organizational levels as well as the presidential ambitions of Marzouki. The latter hindered the party from positioning seriously against the ruling coalition, according to a statement of the resigning members. They also accused the coalition of having plunged Tunisia into an unprecedented political crisis, contributed to the impoverishment of the people and the rooting of fraudulent and corrupt practices. Irada's spokesman Abdulwahid Yahyawi reacted to the wave of departures by calling them painful but predictable due to the conflicts that were dividing the party before.

In April 2019 after the defections, the party changed its name to the Movement Party.

See also
List of political parties in Tunisia

References

2015 establishments in Tunisia
Political parties established in 2015
Political parties in Tunisia
Social democratic parties in Tunisia